Netball at the 2015 Pacific Games in Port Moresby, Papua New Guinea was held on July 13–18, 2015.

Preliminary round

Pool A

Pool B

Consolation matches

Knockout stage

Semi-finals

Third place match

Final

Final standings

See also
 Netball at the Pacific Games

References

 Official results. Scoreboard. Retrieved 21 December 2017

2015 Pacific Games
Pacific Games
Netball at the Pacific Games
South Pacific